A Man Named Scott is a 2021 documentary film centered on American musician and actor Scott Mescudi, better known as Kid Cudi. Directed by Robert Alexander, it was released on Amazon Prime Video on November 5, 2021. The title of the film, which is reminiscent of Cudi's 2008 breakout mixtape A Kid Named Cudi, is borrowed from his scrapped 2011 mixtape of the same name.

Summary
The film follows the career of Kid Cudi (born Scott Mescudi), beginning with the release of his influential 2009 debut album Man on the Moon: The End of Day, which featured songs that dealt with depression, anxiety and loneliness. The film explores his creative process over the past decade, as well as his struggles and breakthroughs.

Cast
 Scott Mescudi
 Kanye West
 Timothée Chalamet
 Shia LaBeouf
 Willow Smith
 Jaden Smith
 Lil Yachty
 Pharrell Williams
 ASAP Rocky
 Schoolboy Q

Release
The promotional trailer for the film was released on October 26, 2021. The film was released on Prime Video on November 5, 2021.

Reception
Chris Azzopardi of The New York Times wrote, "This film about Kid Cudi is that rare musician-focused documentary, one as sensitive, fully formed and noble in its intentions as the artist himself." Jude Dry of IndieWire wrote that the film "rightfully highlights Cudi's contribution to culture as an emotional truth teller," but added that it "lacks the artistic vision of Cudi's musical talents, despite its best efforts." Lovia Gyarkye of The Hollywood Reporter commented on how the film's ending would “start to feel like forced attempts at profundity, as if Cudi's testimony alone hasn't always been enough.”

References

External links

Further reading
 16 Things We Learned From the New Kid Cudi Documentary ‘A Man Named Scott’. Complex. Retrieved November 30, 2021

2021 films
2021 documentary films
American documentary films
Amazon Studios films
Documentary films about hip hop music and musicians
Amazon Prime Video original films
Mad Solar productions
Kid Cudi
2020s English-language films
2020s American films